The given name Ney may refer to:

 Ney Raúl Avilés (born 1964), retired Ecuadorian footballer
 Ney Dimaculangan (born 1982), Filipino musician
 Ney Elias (1844–1897), British explorer, geographer and diplomat
 Ney Fabiano (born 1979), Brazilian footballer
 Ney Franco (born 1966), Brazilian football manager and coach
 Ney González Sánchez (born 1963), Mexican politician, former governor of Nayarit
 Ney Matogrosso (born 1941), Brazilian singer
 Ney Santanna (born 1954), Brazilian actor
 Ney Santos (born 1981), Brazilian footballer

See also
Ney (disambiguation)
Ney (surname)